J. Russell George is an American attorney who has served as the Treasury Inspector General for Tax Administration at the Internal Revenue Service since 2004.

Early life and education 
A native of New York City, George attended public schools, including Brooklyn Technical High School. He then received his Bachelor of Arts degree from Howard University and Juris Doctor from Harvard Law School.

Career 
After graduating from law school, George worked as a prosecutor. He then served as Assistant General Counsel in the Office of Management and Budget. He later served as Associate Director for Policy in the Corporation for National and Community Service before returning to New York City and practicing law at Kramer Levin Naftalis & Frankel.

In 1995, George began serving as the Staff Director and Chief Counsel of the United States House Committee on Oversight and Reform and of the Subcommittee on Government Efficiency, Financial Management and Intergovernmental Relations, then chaired by Representative Steve Horn. George was nominated to serve as Inspector General of the Corporation for National and Community Service by George W. Bush in 2002. In 2004, he became the Treasury Inspector General for Tax Administration, and has since served under four presidents. In 2013, George testified before Congress in the IRS targeting controversy.

References

External links

IRS scandal
American civil servants
Brooklyn Technical High School alumni
Harvard Law School alumni
Howard University alumni
Living people
Year of birth missing (living people)